Sergei Vladimirovich Makhlai, a.k.a. George Mack (US name change) (Russian: Махлай Сергей Владимирович; born February 16, 1969) is a Russian businessman and majority shareholder of TogliattiAzot, one of the world's largest producers of ammonia, chairman of the board of directors of TogliattiAzot in 2012–2017.

Family and education
Sergei Vladimirovich Makhlai was born in 1969 in Gubakha, Perm Krai, where he also attended school. From 1987 to 1989, he performed mandatory military service. He then worked for several years in various middle management roles with construction companies in Togliatti. In 1993, he graduated from Togliatti State University with an undergraduate degree in engineering. He later obtained an MBA at the University of North Carolina.

Shortly after obtaining his MBA, Sergei Makhlai was granted US citizenship. Currently, he lives in the United States under the name of George Mack.

Career 

Since 2004, he has been a member of the board of JSCB Togliattikhimbank (Samara), in which he is the sole owner, according to Central Bank of Russia. Since 2005, Sergei Makhlai was a member of the board of JSCB RTS Bank (Togliatti), which was beneficially owned by his wife Irina Makhlai (74%) and brother Andrey Makhlai (26%). In March 2019, Bank of Russia withdrew the general banking licence from RTS Bank, initiated bankruptcy proceedings against it, and submitted information about suspicious activities at RTS Bank to the law enforcement authorities.

In March 2011, he was elected chairman of TogliattiAzot, replacing his father, Vladimir Makhlai. Sergey Makhlai continued to serve as Chairman of the Board of Directors until 2015, when he was suspended from this position by the court as a result of a criminal investigation. He resigned from the Board in 2017.

In a media interview Vladimir Makhlai accused his sons Sergei and Andrey of "stealing" the company from him in 2011. He claimed that "in just a day they discharged me from all positions, seized offshore companies and booted me off the trusts". He also accused his sons of breaking the law by creating a cross-shareholding structure with the owner of the Swiss ammonia trading company Ameropa Holding, Andreas Zivy.

TogliattiAzot

According to Vyacheslav Suslov, the former General Director of Togliattiazot, after Sergei Makhlai became chairman in 2011, the quality of corporate governance improved while revenues, tax payments, and dividends increase. However, at the next Annual General Meeting in 2012, the largest minority shareholder, Uralchem, voted against the resolution to approve the annual financial report claiming that net income for 2011 was understated by approximately US$200 million, while access for another minority shareholder was blocked by a court decision.

In the same year, the Russian financial markets regulator FSFR found TOAZ in violation of its obligations to provide shareholders with information. The commercial court upheld the decision but TOAZ continued to ignore the ruling.

Following his appointment in 2011, Sergei Makhlai announced a large-scale modernization program of the plant's facilities through 2020. The following year, inspections held by the environmental and technological watchdog Rostekhnadzor identified over 300 industrial safety violations caused by disrepair and depreciation of equipment handling toxic and highly flammable substances.

In 2014, a cistern exploded at Ammonia Unit 4. In 2015, the ammonia pipeline ruptured in Voronezh Region resulting in leakage of half a tonne of ammonia. In January 2016, a serious breakdown occurred at the pre-transportation processing workshop resulting in a severe spillage of ammonia. In February 2017, several ammonia units were shut down in an emergency which the plant management failed to explain. In October 2018, a plant worker died of ammonia poisoning at Workshop 26. On 16 October 2018, 3,000 cubic meters of gas exploded at Ammonia Unit 4, causing a big fire. In May 2019, leakage of natural gas was detected at the gas metering facility. In October 2019, another large-scale gas leakage at the main pipeline causes local emergency situation.

Following new inspections in the autumn of 2019, Rostekhnadzor came to the conclusion that some of the production facilities at Togliattiazot could no longer be operational due to systemic violations of mandatory guidelines for operating hazardous production facilities. A local court ruled to enforce suspension of a number of plant's facilities, including tower cranes, neutraliser tank at the Workshop 06A, storage of raw acids and alkali, and Workshop 16.

In 2015, TogliattiAzot spent 460 million rubles on environmental protection initiatives, such as enhanced water and air quality monitoring.

In 2016, TogliattiAzot announced continued plans for development of an ammonia transshipment terminal at the port of Taman in the Krasnodar region.

Under Makhlai's leadership, TogliattiAzot increased its profits by 44% and revenue by 31% in 2015. The main factors driving growth were an increase in urea production, facility modernization, and an increase in export earnings due to the devaluation of the ruble. TogliattiAzot increased tax payments to the Samara region by more than 50% over 2014, paying 7.3 billion rubles. The company paid 5.4 billion rubles that year in federal taxes.

In 2018, Samara Region arbitration tribunal passed a final judgement to recover 816 million roubles in underdeclared taxes for 2012–2013 from Togliattiazot.

In December 2014, in response to a reporter's question about whether TogliattiAzot has become a foreign company, Makhlai said that "TogliattiAzot has been and will always be a Russian company. The plant is a major employer in Togliatti and is among top 3 primary tax payers of the Samara region." TogliattiAzot paid 7.3 billion rubles to the Samara region and 5.4 billion rubles to the federal government in the 2015 fiscal year.

Criminal investigation and conviction 

On 16 May 2019, the Investigative Committee of the Russian Federation opened criminal case against a group of individuals including Sergei Makhlai under Article 210 of the Russian Criminal Code (organization of a criminal community or participation in it). As part of this investigation General Director of Togliattikhimbank Alexander Popov was arrested two weeks later. RAPSI, Russian legal and judicial newswire, reported that a group of people led by Vladimir Makhlai was suspected in committing a number of serious economic crimes during the period 2005 – 2013.

On 5 July 2019, the Komsomolsky District Court in Togliatti found Sergei and Vladimir Makhlai, Andreas Zivy and two other connected persons guilty of theft totalling Rub 77 billion from Togliattiazot and inflicting damages to minority shareholders in the amount of Rub 10.7 billion.

The Court sentenced both Vladimir and Sergei Makhlai to nine years in prison. Because all the defendants at the time of the sentence were abroad, the sentence was imposed in absentia.

During the Court investigation, it was established that in 2007 President of ZAO Togliattiazot Corporation Vladimir Makhlai and his son Sergei Makhlai, who at that time was Vice-president of the company, used their corporate authority to form an organised criminal group for a systematic theft of the company's products – ammonia and urea.

To facilitate the crime, Court found, settlement and currency accounts of Togliattiazot OJSC were opened in Togliattiimbank, 100% owned by Sergey Makhlai. These accounts were used to receive the proceeds from the sales of TOAZ products to the offshore-registered Swiss firm Nitrochem Distribution AG, led by Beat Ruprecht and owned by Andreas Zivy's Ameropa AG.

A share of the proceeds was kept by the defendants and was not paid to TOAZ. Moreover, the prices for the products were stated significantly below current market prices, to illegally decrease tax liability. Thus, Vladimir and Sergey Makhlai, Zivy and Ruprecht defrauded TOAZ and its shareholders of a total of Rub 85 billion. During the trial, the facts of affiliation between TOAZ, Nitrochem Distribution AG and Ameropa AG were fully proven.

On 26 November 2019, Samara Regional Court made a decision to uphold the verdict of Komsomolsk District Court against Sergei and Vladimir Makhlai and their accomplices.

In 2020, Investigate Committee of Russia started an investigation against Sergei Makhlai for a suspected attempt to bribe members of the Supreme Court for quashing a decision to recover Rub 2.5 billion of unpaid taxes.

He is reportedly also investigated in Ukraine on suspicion of bribing a state official, Viktor Bondyk, former CEO of a state-owned company that manages the cross-country ammonia pipeline.

Personal life 
Makhlai's grandparents worked as miners in Gubakha after moving there from Kherson, a city in southern Ukraine. He has one brother, Andrei. Makhlai is married and has two daughters.

Makhlai's father Vladimir is a former chairman of TogliattiAzot.

Philanthropy and public service

Sergei Makhlai has publicly stated his philanthropic goals to include the defence of Russia's moral values and traditions. To that end under his leadership TOAZ workers staged a demonstration condemning female members of punk group Pussy riot serving jail terms for participating in a political protest at Russia's main Orthodox cathedral. The workers’ resolution endorsed by Makhlai called for Pussy Riot to come to TOAZ for "re-education" by local workers after their release from prison. In the same interview to Huffington Post, he accused western countries in being "constantly hungry for upheaval in Russia".

Under Makhlai's leadership, TogliattiAzot increased its spending on local social initiatives. The company was named 2015 Philanthropist of the Year by the Togliatti Fund. TogliattiAzot sponsors the Tremolo Music and Arts Festival in Togliatti and the Togliatti Philharmonic's "Save the Steinway" campaign.

As of 2012, Makhlai served on the board of Togliatti State University.

References

Links 
 Sergei Makhlai: "The ability to influence the future of TogliattiAzot is a huge responsibility"

Living people
1968 births
Russian businesspeople in the United States